Persatuan Sepak Bola Indonesia Semarang ( 'Indonesian Football Association of Semarang'), commonly known by its abbreviation PSIS is an Indonesian professional football club based in Semarang, Central Java. The club play their home matches in the Jatidiri Stadium. They currently compete in Liga 1, the top flight of Indonesian football.

History
Founded in 1932, PSIS is one of the oldest football teams in Indonesia. It was previously known as Voetbalbond Indonesia Semarang.

First title victory
Before the professional league was held in 1994/1995, PSIS joined Perserikatan, an amateur football competition organized by PSSI. Their greatest success was in the 1986/87 seasons when PSIS won the title after defeating Persebaya Surabaya in the final 1–0 by Syaiful Amri's Goal. At the time, PSIS legend Ribut Waidi was in the team. There is now a sculpture of Ribut Waidi in the center of Semarang city.

Ligina (Liga Indonesia) Era

In 1994, when Perserikatan and Galatama merged to form Liga Indonesia, PSIS was placed in the Premier division. In the 1998/1999 season, PSIS attained their highest achievement by winning the probe. In the final, PSIS defeated Persebaya Surabaya with score 1–0 in a Final match which was held at Manado. The goal was scored by Tugiyo, who was renowned as "Maradona from Purwodadi", in the injury time of the second half. But after that excellent performance, PSIS did not do well in the transfer window. Consequently, PSIS were ironically relegated in 1999/2000 season. A year later, PSIS managed to secure a promotion ticket back again to the Premier division.

Golden Era: 2005–2007

PSIS Semarang makes a surprise by accomplished 3rd place after defeating PSMS Medan with a score of 2–1. The ordinary player like M. Ridwan, Khusnul Yakin, Modestus Setiawan, Idrus Gunawan, Maman Abdurrahman and Abdoulaye Djibril Diallo become superstars and wanted by bigger team. Also helped by Superb Signing Emanuel De Porras and the touch of Indonesian legend, coach Bambang Nurdiansyah.

In 2006, competed in the Western Zone, PSIS finished in 3rd place of regular home and away season. Therefore, PSIS went to the next round robin elimination system with 7 other teams which were split into two groups of 4. In this round, PSIS won the first match against Arema Malang, 1–0, courtesy of a Gustavo Hernan Ortiz's goal. However, they were defeated by Persik Kediri with a score of 1–3 on matchday 2 of the round robin elimination system. PSIS needed a win in the last match against Persiba Balikpapan to progress to the semi-final, and they successfully booked a place in the semi-final with 1–0 victory in a controversially postponed match due to the pitch invasion by the fans.
In the semi-final match, PSIS won 1–0 against Persekabpas Pasuruan who defeated them twice in a regular home and away season. In the grand final, PSIS met Persik Kediri once again, and PSIS were defeated with the score of 0–1 in extra time. The goal was scored by Christian Gonzalez in 107th minutes. The result brought PSIS as runner-up in 2006 season.

In 2007 season, PSIS have successfully recruited Julio Lopez from Chile. Julio Lopez is projected as a replacement for Emanuel De Porras who controversially left the team after a defeat in the 2006 Liga Indonesia grand final despite the fact that PSIS were still due to be competing in Copa Dji Sam Soe against Persija Jakarta a few days later.

Super League Era and After no more Regional Government Budget Support

After Indonesian Government regulates that no more Regional Government Budget to Support Football Team, PSIS can not recruit Stars Player anymore. PSIS also can't defend their local stars like M. Ridwan, Khusnul Yakin, Imral Usman, Yaris Riyadi, Maman Abdurrahman, and many other. PSIS can give them expected salary.

In the 2008 season, PSIS and PKT Bontang joined the Indonesia Super League, replacing Persmin Minahasa and Persiter Ternate.

In the 2011–2012 season, when a tumultuous of football Indonesia, PSIS Semarang choose 2011–12 Indonesian Premier Division under the authority of PT Liga Prima Indonesia Sportindo (LPIS). finished in 5th position at 2nd group defeat by the other football Team from Central Java like PSIR Rembang and PSCS Cilacap.

In the 2013 season, PSIS moved to Divisi Utama, edition of Liga Indonesia Premier Division since its establishment in 1994 under the authority of PT Liga Indonesia. PSIS be better in this seasons.  success through the second round. Ronald Fagundez and Addison Alves injury in the second round and can replace by young players, make PSIS defeated by the champion Persebaya Surabaya, PSBS Biak Numfor, and PS Bangka.

Scandal in 2014 season

PSIS Semarang which reinforced two foreign players Julio Alcorsé and Ronald Fagundez start 2014 Liga Indonesia Premier Division with extraordinary, topped the standings in Group 4 with only 1 defeat. In the 2nd round, PSIS Semarang played so fantastic and has been ascertained advance to the semi-finals along with PSS Sleman before 2nd round finished, including a victory against Persiwa Wamena 5–0. Hari Nur Yulianto scored 14 goals and being the 4th top goal scorer of 2014 Liga Indonesia Premier Division and Julio Alcorsé in the 7th position with 13 goals.

Steps painstakingly built since the beginning of the season had to end tragically in the final match for the position of which only the group winners and runners-up with PSS Sleman. PSS Sleman and PSIS Semarang involved in match fixing where both clubs wanted to be defeated in order not to meet with Borneo Samarinda. In that match, both teams scored  5 own goals in 7 minutes, and finally the game ended with a score of 2–3 for PSS Sleman.
As a result of this scandal, PSIS Semarang were disqualified from 2nd round (round of 8). While head coach Eko Riyadi, striker Saptono, Fadli Manan and goal keeper Catur Adi Nugraha received a lifetime sentence should not be playing in football Indonesia and fines each of 100 million rupiahs.

Statistics

Season by season record 

Key to league record:
 Pos = Final position
 P = Played
 W = Games won
 D = Games drawn
 L = Games lost
 GF = Goals for
 GA = Goals against
 GD = Goal difference
 Pts = Points

Key to rounds:
 W = Winner
 F = Final
 SF = Semi-finals
 QF = Quarter-finals
 R16 = Round of 16
 R32 = Round of 32
 R64 = Round of 64
 R5 = Fifth round
 R4 = Fourth round
 R3 = Third round
 R2 = Second round
 R1 = First round
 GS = Group stage

Key to competitions
 Cup = Piala Indonesia
 CL = AFC Champions League
 AC = AFC Cup

Seasons

Continental history

Crest and Colours

Amongst PSIS most popular nicknames are Mahesa Jenar Warrior. From the foundation of the club, the common home kit includes a blue shirt and blue shorts. The away kit of the club is associated with a white or black background.

Supporters and rivalries
PSIS Semarang's supporters call themselves Panser Biru (Pasukan Suporter Semarang Biru) and SneX (Suporter Semarang Extreme) Indonesia's most passionate and fanatical supporters.
Panser Biru birth on March 25, 2001, and through a long process. When PSIS became champions in 1999, Actually is already a lot of fans Semarang and surrounding areas Mahesa Jenar warrior loyal support, but when it has not been coordinated.
Along with PSIS relegation to Division I, some supporters of the fans wants to form an organization that coordinated the first in Semarang good and neat. Therefore, October 22, 2000, at the House of Diamonds (Rumah Berlian), approximately 15 fanatical supporters hold the first conference.
Finally agreed on that day to set up a Care Forum PSIS Semarang. They then continue a proceed with the conference on October 29, 2000, which was attended by about 35 people . Until in the end on 5 November 2000 at GOR Tri Lomba Juang, forming a Panser Biru. Biru means Blue color (the pride color of PSIS Semarang Jersey) and Panser means Panzer (Tank) show the struggling of PSIS Supporter.
SneX (Suporter Semarang Extreme) actually a part of Panser Biru, but on March 20, 2005, they became an Independent organization.

Rivalries
PSIS has a rivalry with Persis Solo because of the prestige between the two teams in Central Java, their supporters are always fight. The rivalry with Persebaya Surabaya was born from the controversy of Sepakbola Gajah since Perserikatan. Until now the two clubs always compete with high tension when they meet. PSIS supporters had a rivalry with supporters of Persijap Jepara because of the riots that had already taken place. But now they are at peace and there is no longer friction between groups.

Mascot
Warak ngendog is a fictional fauna that depicts the symbols of unity of all ethnic groups in Semarang, namely ethnic Javanese, ethnic Arabian, and ethnic Chinese. Ethnic unity creates a harmonious and peaceful city of Semarang. Like PSIS Semarang which is also a union of various layers of society in the city of Semarang. The Warak ngendog (Warak Dragon) mascot is more inclusive of all walks of life from various Ethnic and Religion, compared to the MJ mascot (Mahesa Jenar) which is identical to fictional figures that are more focused on one group, namely Islam.

Mascots are often used to liven up the atmosphere and make it interesting for promotions or events held by PSIS Semarang. The mascot does not only function as an identity, or as an encouragement from the sidelines, but also becomes a brand and trademark, also brings joy, and unity fans of PSIS Semarang.

Players

Current squad

Out on loan

Official staff

Honours

AFC (Asian competitions)
 Asian Club Championship
 First round (1): 1999-2000

Friendly tournaments
 Piala Emas Bang Yos
 Runner-Up (1): 2006
 Piala Kampoeng Semawis
 Winner (1): 2009
 Piala Polda Jateng
 Winner (1): 2015
 Piala Siliwangi
 Winner (1): 1983
 Piala Tugu Muda
 Winner (1): 1978
 Sultan Hassanal Bolkiah Cup
 Runner-Up (1): 1987
 Trofeo Pesantenan
 Runner-Up (1): 2019

See also
 List of football clubs in Indonesia

References

External links
 Official website

Semarang
Football clubs in Indonesia
Football clubs in Central Java
Association football clubs established in 1932
Indonesian Premier Division winners
1932 establishments in the Dutch East Indies